Mella Thiranthathu Kathavu ( The door opened slowly) is a 2015-2017 Tamil language soap opera that aired on Zee Tamil. The show premiered on 2 November 2015 to 27 October 2017 with 511 episodes. It starring Ashwanth Ashokkumar and Lisha with Venkat Renganathan, Gayathri Yuvraaj and Anu Sulash

It aired Monday through Friday 8:00PM IST and 10:00PM IST, 7:00PM (IST) after 27 December 2016, 1:00PM (IST) after 28 August 2017 and 12:00PM (IST) after 9 October 2017. The Serial directed by Arul Raj Bramma G. Dev and producer by Divya Viswanathan.

Season 1
The serial story about heart-warming love story between two visually challenged people- Santhosh and Selvi.

Cast

Main
 Santhosh and Venkat Ranganathan as Santhosh (Selvi Husband)
 Sreethu Nair and Gayathri Yuvraaj as Selvi

Supporting
 Anu as Maya
 K K Menon
 Sofia 
 Moses  
 Vandhana 
 Selvi 
 Kayal
 Shyam
 Hema Rajkumar
 Pavithra Janani
 Madhu
 Sri Lekha
 Sandya

Season 2
The second season, titled Mella Thirandhathu Kadhavu; Iru Minmipochikalin Kathai, Junior Super Stars fame Ashwanth Ashokkumar and Lisha doing lead role.

Cast
 Lisha as Anjali (Santhosh & Selvi Daughter)
 Ashwanth Ashokkumar as Ashwanth (Santhosh & Maya Son)
 Gayathri Yuvraaj as Manju /Selvi / Anjamma  (Santhosh 1st Wife)
 Venkat Renganathan as Santhosh (Selvi & Maya Husband)
 Anu Sulash as Maya (Santhosh 2nd Wife/Ashwanth Mother)
 Nathan Shyam as Gowtham (Priya Husband)
 Akila as Priya (Gowtham Wife)
 Jeevitha as Deepa
 Rinthiya
 Poovilangu Mohan
 Shilpa

Seasons overview

Airing history 
The show started airing on Zee Tamil on 2 November 2015 and It aired on Monday through Friday 8:00PM IST and 10PM IST. Later its timing changed Starting from Monday 4 April 2016, the show was shifted to 7:30PM (IST) time Slot. A show named Sollavathellam Unmai replaced this show at 8:00PM IST. Starting from Monday 27 December 2016, the show was shifted to 7:00PM (IST) time Slot. On 28 August 2017 the show shifted to airs Monday through Friday at 1:00PM (IST) time Slot. A show named Azhagiya Tamil Magal replaced this show at 7:00PM (IST). Starting from Monday 9 October 2017, the show was shifted to 12:00PM (IST) time Slot. A named Solvathellam Unmai replaced this show at 1:00PM (IST).

Awards and nominations

References

External links
 

Zee Tamil original programming
Tamil-language romance television series
Television shows set in Tamil Nadu
2015 Tamil-language television series debuts
Tamil-language television shows
2017 Tamil-language television seasons
2017 Tamil-language television series endings
Tamil-language melodrama television series